Benjamin Trott (born September 22, 1977) is a co-founder (with ex-wife Mena Trott) of Six Apart, creator of Movable Type and TypePad. In November 2010, he became Chief Technical Officer (CTO) of SAY Media, a new online advertising and software company formed by a merger of ad network VideoEgg with Six Apart.

Before joining SAY Media, Trott was also CTO of Six Apart. He is a regular contributor to CPAN (the Comprehensive Perl Archive Network), and has written for Perl.com and contributed to Essential Blogging. In 2004, he was named to the MIT Technology Review TR100 as one of the top 100 innovators in the world under the age of 35.

Influence of Six Apart
Trott originally developed Movable Type in 2001 during a period of unemployment to help Mena Trott, his wife, with her blog, but the commercial potential was shown by over 100 downloads during the first hour it was made public. It became the dominant self-hosted blogging software platform for several years, until surpassed by WordPress later in the decade.

In 2003, Six Apart launched TypePad, a popular hosted weblog service. Both came under heavy criticism in 2004 after moves to charge users to use the popular Movable Type system, even though there remained a free non-commercial version. In January 2005, Six Apart purchased LiveJournal, another pioneer in blogging, later selling it at a profit. The company also started a fourth blogging solution, Vox, which it shut down shortly before the SAY Media acquisition in late 2010. Say Media later sold TypePad to Endurance International Group.

References

External links
 SAY Media
 About Six Apart
 stupidfool.org, Ben Trott's personal blog

American bloggers
People from Sonoma County, California
1977 births
Living people
American computer programmers
21st-century American businesspeople